Bridge Great Britain is an organisation which was formed to continue the organisational functions of the British Bridge League from 1 January 2000 when that body was dissolved at the end of 1999. It organises the Gold Cup and several annual international bridge competitions between  representing England, Northern Ireland, the Republic of Ireland, Scotland, and Wales; including the Camrose Trophy and like events.

See also

List of bridge competitions and awards
Australian Bridge Federation

References

External links

Contract bridge governing bodies
Organizations established in 2000
2000 establishments in the United Kingdom
Contract bridge in the United Kingdom
Sports governing bodies in the United Kingdom